Ghamandee is a 1981 Indian Hindi-language film, directed by Ramesh Bedi for producer Kailash Chander. The film starred   Mithun Chakraborty in the lead along with Sarika and Ranjeet.

Plot

Cast
 Mithun Chakraborty
 Sarika
 Aruna Irani
 Paintal
 Ranjeet
 Mohan Sherry

Soundtrack
 "Kehta Hai Man Ka Panchhi" - Asha Bhosle, Suresh Wadkar
 "Ghunghat Me Naina" - Asha Bhosle
 "Dhalti Huyi Is Raat Ka" - Kamla Rao
 "Khuda Ko Khuda Samajhte Rahe" - Rajendra Mehta 
 "Sathi Hai Hum Janmo Ke" - Asha Bhosle

References

External links
 

1981 films
1980s Hindi-language films
Indian action films
1981 action films
Films scored by Govind–Naresh
Hindi-language action films